Aorangi School was located in the suburb of Bryndwr in Christchurch, Canterbury, New Zealand. The school was closed by the government on 27 January 2010.

About 40 of the former Aorangi School students transferred to Burnside Primary School. The last principal was Stephanie Thompson. The school's roll before closure was 87.

The prime minister, John Key, was a student at Aorangi.

See also
List of schools in the Canterbury Region

References

Primary schools in Christchurch
Defunct schools in New Zealand
Educational institutions disestablished in 2010
2010 disestablishments in New Zealand